Frederick Frelinghuysen Cornell (November 16,1804 – August 7,1875) was pastor of Pluckemin Presbyterian Church, classics scholar, missionary and instructor.

Early life 
He was born on November 16, at Allentown, New Jersey. Frederick was the fourth child and eldest son of Reverend John Cornell and Maria Frelinghuysen. In 1825 he graduated from Princeton (College of New Jersey). During his time at Princeton, Cornell partly translated Tacitus from Carey's Philadelphia Latin edition of 1808. In 1828 he graduated from New Brunswick Theological Seminary.

Career 
In 1829, became a member of the Newtown Presbyterian Church. From 1828–29 he was a professor of languages, College of Mississippi, at Natchez.

He became a missionary. He served in 1829, at Stuyvesant, from 1829–31, at Columbiaville., from 1831–1832, at Marshallville. and from 1833–1836 in Montville.

He then became a pastor, serving from 1836–1856  pastor of Manhattan Reformed Dutch Church in New York City, from 1856–1864 and at Pluckemin Presbyterian Church.

In 1866 he received the degree of Doctor of Divinity from Union College.

He died at home in Somerset, New Jersey on August 7, 1875. 

He had married Elizabeth Clock Bell (1822–1882).

References

Sources

1804 births
1875 deaths
People from Somerset County, New Jersey
Presbyterian Church in the United States of America ministers
Princeton University alumni
New Brunswick Theological Seminary alumni
19th-century American clergy